The 1990 Campeonato Paulista da Primeira Divisão de Futebol Profissional was the 89th season of São Paulo's top professional football league. Bragantino won the championship by the first time. No teams were relegated.

Championship
The twenty-four teams of the championship were divided into two groups of twelve teams, with each team playing once against the teams of its own group and the other group. Group 1 comprised the twelve best teams in the previous year's championship, while Group 2 had the ten worst teams of that championship and the two teams that had been promoted from the second level. The three best teams of each group, plus the six overall best teams aside of them would qualify to the Third phase, while the others that had been eliminated would participate in the Second phase. 

The Second phase's twelve teams were divided into two groups of six, with each team playing twice against the teams of its own group, with the best team of each group qualifying to The Third phase and 1991's Green Group. In the third phase, the fourteen teams were divided into two groups of seven, with each team playing twice against the teams of its own group, and the best team of each group qualifying to the Finals.

First phase

Group 1

Group 2

Second phase

Group 1

Group 2

Third phase

Group Black

Group Red

Finals

|}

References

Campeonato Paulista seasons
Paulista